Herbert Ralph Peterson (January 5, 1919 – March 25, 2008) was an American fast food advertising executive and food scientist most known for being the inventor of the McDonald's Egg McMuffin in 1972. The breakfast business that he pioneered with this item had grown to an estimated $4–5 billion in annual revenues for the fast food restaurant chain McDonald's by 1993.

Life and career
Born and raised in Chicago, Petersen, who served in the United States Marine Corps, where he attained the rank of Major in three years during World War II, began his career with McDonald's as vice president at D'Arcy Advertising in Chicago, which was McDonald's in-house advertising arm, Peterson coined McDonald's first national advertising slogan, "Where Quality Starts Fresh Every Day."

He later became a franchise co-owner and the operator of six McDonald's restaurants in and around Santa Barbara, California.

Peterson developed the Egg McMuffin, which has become a McDonald's breakfast signature item, in 1972.  Peterson was said to like eggs benedict, so he worked to develop a breakfast item which was similar to it for the fast food chain. Peterson eventually came up with the Egg McMuffin, which was an egg sandwich consisting of an egg formed in a Teflon circle with the yolks broken, topped with Canadian bacon and a slice of cheese. The Egg McMuffin was served as an open faced sandwich on a buttered and toasted English muffin.

The Egg McMuffin was created and first sold at a McDonald's in Goleta, California (Fairview Avenue location with placard outside marking the location)  which Peterson co-owned with his son, David Peterson.

Death
Peterson died in Santa Barbara on March 25, 2008, at the age of 89. He was survived by his wife, son and three daughters. A memorial service for Peterson was held on April 23, 2008, in Montecito, California.
Herb Peterson is the grandfather of professional surfer Lakey Peterson.

References

1919 births
2008 deaths
American food industry business executives
American food scientists
McDonald's people
Businesspeople from Chicago
People from Santa Barbara, California
American advertising executives
United States Navy personnel of World War II
20th-century American businesspeople
Burials at Santa Barbara Cemetery